Wenche Elisabeth Selmer (23 May 1920 – 30 May 1998) was a Norwegian architect. She specialized in timber architecture, working residential projects. Her wooden cabins and houses were inspired by nature and designed to not overwhelm or dominate but rather blend with the natural landscape.

Biography
Wenche Elisabeth Reimers was born in Paris, France while his father was pursued law practice. She was the daughter of attorney Herman Foss Reimers (1874-1961) and Birgit Bødtker Næss (1882-1945). Her family returned to Norway when she was six years old and settled at Vestre Aker in Oslo. She graduated from the Norwegian National Academy of Craft and Art Industry (Statens håndverks- og kunstindustriskole) in 1945. After graduating, she apprenticed with  architect Arnstein Arneberg who was married to her older half-sister, Eva Reimers (1901–1987). She followed with a year of training with architect Marcel Lods at the Ecole des Beaux-Arts in Paris. From 1948 she worked for architects Arne Pedersen (1897-1951) and Reidar Winge Lund (1908-1978) in Oslo. In 1954, she started her  architectural firm and began a collaboration with Jens Andreas Selmer. She taught at the Oslo School of Architecture and Design from 1976 to 1987.

Awards
1962-63 - Sundts premie, with Jens Selmer
1969 - Treprisen, with Jens Selmer

Personal life
In 1941, she married James Robert Collett (1914-1941). In 1954, she married Jens Andreas Selmer (1911-1995)

References

Other sources
Elisabeth Tostrup (2006) Norwegian Wood: The Thoughtful Architecture of Wenche Selmer (Princeton Architectural Press)

External links
 

1920 births
1998 deaths
Norwegian women architects
Oslo National Academy of the Arts alumni
École des Beaux-Arts alumni
Academic staff of the Oslo School of Architecture and Design
Norwegian expatriates in France